The Australia women's national artistic gymnastics team represents Australia in FIG international competitions.

History
Australia has participated in the Olympic Games women's team competition seven times. It has also participated in the women's team competition at the World Artistic Gymnastics Championships 20 times, winning a bronze medal in 2003.

2021 senior roster

Team competition results

Olympic Games
 1928 — did not participate
 1936 — did not participate
 1948 — did not participate
 1952 — did not participate
 1956 — did not participate
 1960 — did not participate
 1964 — 10th place
Jan Bedford, Val Buffham-Norris, Barbara Cage, Barbara Fletcher, Lynette Hancock, Valerie Roberts
 1968 — did not participate
 1972 — did not participate
 1976 — did not participate
 1980 — did not participate
 1984 — did not participate
 1988 — did not participate
 1992 — 7th place
Monique Allen, Brooke Gysen, Julie-Anne Monico, Lisa Read, Kylie Shadbolt, Jane Warrilow
 1996 — 10th place
Joanna Hughes, Nicole Kantek, Ruth Moniz, Lisa Moro, Lisa Skinner, Jennyfer Smith
 2000 — 7th place
Melinda Cleland, Alex Croak, Trudy McIntosh, Lisa Skinner, Allana Slater, Brooke Walker
 2004 — 8th place
Stephanie Moorhouse, Melissa Munro, Karen Nguyen, Monette Russo, Lisa Skinner, Allana Slater
 2008 — 6th place
Ashleigh Brennan, Georgia Bonora, Daria Joura, Lauren Mitchell, Shona Morgan, Olivia Vivian
 2012 — 10th place
Ashleigh Brennan, Georgia Bonora, Emily Little, Larrissa Miller, Lauren Mitchell

World Championships
 1934 — did not participate
 1938 — did not participate
 1950 — did not participate
 1954 — did not participate
 1958 — did not participate
 1962 — did not participate
 1966 — did not participate
 1970 — 18th place
Jan Bedford, Sharman Cook, Dorothy Doig, Pamela Evans, Coralie Hill, Jennifer Sunderland
 1974 — 21st place
 1978 — 20th place
 1979 — 20th place
Kerryn Bailey, Kerry Bayliss, Janice Edelsten, Karen Edelsten, Leanne Stevens, Marina Sulicich
 1981 — 17th place
Heidi Amundsen, Wanita Lynch, Joanne McCallum, Philippa Ray, Jenny Roberts, Kellie Wilson
 1983 — 23rd place
Keri Battersby, Jennifer Curtin, Susan Miller, Ilana Sharp, Susan Turnbull, Michelle White
 1985 — 17th place
Debbie Graham, Leanne Rycroft, Michelle Saliba, Carolyn Stewart, Susan Turnbull, Kellie Wilson
 1987 — 18th place
Monique Allen, Kellie Larter, Lisa Read, Leanne Rycroft, Carolyn Stewart, Katie Watts
 1989 — 16th place
Monique Allen, Jenny Clack, Jodie Rogers, Kylie Shadbolt, Michelle Telfer, Jane Warrilow
 1991 — 6th place
Monique Allen, Joanna Hughes, Julie-Anne Monico, Lisa Read, Kylie Shadbolt, Michelle Telfer
 1994 — did not participate
 1995 — 12th place
Kirsty-Leigh Brown, Joanna Hughes, Nicole Kantek, Ruth Moniz, Lisa Moro, Genevieve Preston, Lisa Skinner
 1997 — 11th place
Rebekah Armbruster, Zeena McLaughin, Ruth Moniz, Lisa Skinner, Rebecca Wilson
 1999 — 4th place
Jacqui Dunn, Trudy McIntosh, Lisa Skinner, Allana Slater, Jennyfer Smith, Brooke Walker
 2001 — 7th place
Alex Croak, Jacqui Dunn, Allison Johnston, Allana Slater, Kylie Tanner, Jessica Zarnay
 2003 —  bronze medal
Belinda Archer, Jacqui Dunn, Danielle Kelly, Stephanie Moorhouse, Monette Russo, Allana Slater				
 2006 — 6th place
Georgia Bonora, Hollie Dykes, Melody Hernandez, Daria Joura, Karen Nguyen, Olivia Vivian
 2007 — 11th place
Ashleigh Brennan, Hollie Dykes, Daria Joura, Lauren Mitchell, Shona Morgan, Chloe Sims
 2010 — 6th place
Georgia Bonora, Ashleigh Brennan, Emily Little, Larrissa Miller, Lauren Mitchell
 2011 — 8th place
Ashleigh Brennan, Georgia Rose Brown, Emily Little, Larrissa Miller, Lauren Mitchell, Mary-Anne Monckton
 2014 — 7th place
Georgia Rose Brown, Larrissa Miller, Mary-Anne Monckton, Kiara Munteanu, Emma Nedov, Olivia Vivian

Most decorated gymnasts
This list includes all Australian female artistic gymnasts who have won a medal at the Olympic Games or the World Artistic Gymnastics Championships.

See also
 Women's gymnastics in Australia
 List of Olympic female artistic gymnasts for Australia

References

Gymnastics in Australia
National women's artistic gymnastics teams
Women's national sports teams of Australia